Joseph "Joey" Peppersack (born March 12, 1999) is an American Paralympic swimmer. He represented the United States at the 2020 Summer Paralympic Games.

Career
Joseph was born in 1999 to Jody and Sandy Peppersack with a rare condition known as tibial hemimelia. This resulted in the amputation of his right leg in 2003 when he was four years old. Joey did not begin swimming until he was 9 years old, joining a local club. After a few years and constant encouragement of his natural ability, Joey was persuaded into joining competitive paraswimming in 2011.

Peppersack has competed on the world stage several times. He briefly held the American record in the S8 100m IM and the S8 200m Freestyle.

Peppersack competed in the 100 metre backstroke S8 event at the 2020 Summer Paralympics and placed 7th.

In 2022, Peppersack was renamed to the United States National Team.

References

1999 births
Living people
American disabled sportspeople
American male backstroke swimmers
Paralympic swimmers of the United States
Swimmers at the 2020 Summer Paralympics
Medalists at the 2019 Parapan American Games
American male freestyle swimmers
S8-classified Paralympic swimmers
21st-century American people
University of Mary Washington alumni